James Henry Hargreaves (born 1859 in New York City, United States of America; died 11 April 1922 in Portsmouth, England) was an American-born British first-class cricketer who made his debut for Hampshire against Sussex in 1884. Hargreaves' second and final match was against Surrey in the 1885 season. This was Hampshire's last season with first-class status until the 1895 County Championship.

Hargreaves died at Portsmouth, Hampshire on 11 April 1922.

External links
James Hargreaves at Cricinfo
James Hargreaves at CricketArchive

1859 births
1922 deaths
American emigrants to England
English cricketers
Hampshire cricketers
Cricketers from New York City